The  is Japanese aerial lift line in Kōbe, Hyōgo, operated by Kōbe City Urban Development. Together with Maya Cablecar, the line has an official nickname . Opened in 1955, the line climbs Mount Maya, with a scenic view of the city known as Kikuseidai.

Basic data
Cable length: 
Vertical interval: 
Spans: 1
Main engine:  three-phase motor

See also

List of aerial lifts in Japan
Maya Cablecar
Rokkō Arima Ropeway
Rokkō Cable Line
Shin-Kōbe Ropeway

External links
Mt. Rokko and Mt. Maya Aerial Ride
 Kobe Housing & Urban Development Corporation

Aerial tramways in Japan
1955 establishments in Japan